Fly on the Wall: B Sides & Rarities is a 2003 compilation album by British artist Paul Weller. It comprises three discs of B-sides, rarities, remixes and unreleased tracks from The Go! Discs and Island Records period of Weller's career between 1991 and 2001.

Track listing
Disc One
 "Here's a New Thing" [B-Side of "Into Tomorrow" single]
 "That Spiritual Feeling" [Instrumental B-Side of "Into Tomorrow" single]
 "Into Tomorrow" [Demo Version, B-Side of "Into Tomorrow" single]
 "Arrival Time" [Instrumental B-Side of "Uh Huh Oh Yeh" single]
 "Fly on the Wall" [B-Side of "Uh Huh Oh Yeh" single]
 "Always There to Fool You" [Instrumental B-Side of "Uh Huh Oh Yeh" single]
 "All Year Round" [From More Wood Japanese Import Album]
 "Ends of the Earth" [B-Side of "Wild Wood" single]
 "This is No Time" [B-Side of "The Weaver" single]
 "Another New Day" [Instrumental B-Side of "The Weaver" single]
 "Foot of the Mountain" [Live B-Side of "Hung Up" single]
 "Wild Wood" ['Portishead' Remix, B-Side of "Wild Wood" Single – 1998 Version]
 "Kosmos" ['Lynch Mob Bonus Beats' Remix, B-Side of "Hung Up" single]

Disc Two 
 "The Loved" [B-Side of "Hung Up" single]
  "Steam" [Instrumental B-Side of "Broken Stones" single]
  "It's a New Day Baby" [B-Side of "The Changing Man" single]
  "A Year Late" [B-Side of "You Do Something To Me"]
  "Eye of the Storm" [Instrumental B-Side of "Peacock Suit"]
  "Shoot The Dove" [B-Side of "Brushed" single]
  "As You Lean into The Light" [B-Side of "Brushed" single]
  "So You Want To Be a Dancer" [Instrumental B-Side of "Mermaids" single]
  "Everything Has a Price to Pay" [1997 'Acoustic' Version, B-Side of "Mermaids" single]
  "Right Underneath It" [B-Side of "Brand New Start" single]
 "Helioscentric" [Instrumental B-Side of "The Keeper" single]
 "There's No Drinking After You're Dead" ['Noonday Underground' Remix, B-Side of "Sweet Pea" single]
 "The Riverbank" [B-Side of "Brand New Start" single]
 "Science" [Lynch Mob Remix, B-Side of "Wild Wood" single – '98 Version]

Disc Three – 'Button Downs' 
 "Feelin' Alright" [From More Wood Japanese Import Album, Also B-Side of "Above The Clouds" single]
 "Ohio" [Live at R.A.H. October 1992, B.B.C. Recording – B-Side of "The Weaver" single]
 "Black Sheep Boy" [From More Wood Japanese Import Album]
 "Sexy Sadie" [B-Side of "Out of the Sinking" single]
 "I Shall Be Released" [B-Side of "Out of the Sinking" single]
 "I'd Rather Go Blind" [B-Side of "The Changing Man" single]
 "My Whole World is Falling Down" [BBC Session May 1995, B-Side of "You Do Something To Me" single]
 "Ain't No Love in the Heart of the City" [B-Side of "Brushed" single]
 "Waiting on an Angel" [BBC Session – 23.11.97, Previously Unreleased]
 "Bang-Bang" [B-Side of "The Keeper" single]
 "Instant Karma" [Previously Only Available On 'Uncut' Cover-CD]
 "Don't Let Me Down" [Rare Session Track]

B-side compilation albums
2003 compilation albums
Paul Weller compilation albums